Francisco de Assis Luz Silva (4 October 1943 – 9 September 2020) was a Brazilian professional footballer who played as a defender.

Career
Born in Ananindeua, Assis played for Remo, Fluminense (where he made 424 appearances, winning four state and one national title), Sport Recife, Ceara (where he won a further state title), and ASA de Arapiraca.

References

1943 births
2020 deaths
Brazilian footballers
Clube do Remo players
Fluminense FC players
Sport Club do Recife players
Ceará Sporting Club players
Agremiação Sportiva Arapiraquense players
Association football defenders
Sportspeople from Pará